Amarin TV, fully known as Amarin TV 34 HD, is a Thai digital terrestrial television channel operated by Amarin Television Co., Ltd., a subsidiary of Amarin Printing & Publishing PCL, which is an affiliate of the TCC Group. The networks offers a variety of content such as news, entertainment lifestyle, food and variety programs. It was also one of the broadcasting companies which was granted a license to operate on digital television by the National Broadcasting and Telecommunications Commission in December 2013.

Officially launched on 12 December 2012, the channel initially carried the name of "Amarin Activ TV" on 1 January 2013 but ceased to operate on 31 January 2014. It was later relaunched under its current name on 25 May 2014.

Programming

Amarin News

Thai Drama
{{List of dramas on Amarin TV}}

Samee See Thong (THE HUSBANDS สามีสีทอง) (2019)
Rong Tao Naree (รองเท้านารี) (2019 - 2020)
Talay Prae 2020 (ทะเลแปร) (2020)
Plerng Nang (2020) (เพลิงนาง) (2020)
Bangkert Klao  (บังเกิดเกล้า) (2020 - 2021)
Tawan Tok Din  (ตะวันตกดิน) (2021)
Pleng Bin Bai Ngiew (เพลงบินใบงิ้ว) (2022)
Samee Ngern Phon (สามีเงินผ่อน) (2022)
Fah Tan Tawan (ฟ้า/ทาน/ตะวัน) (2022)
Fai Luang (ไฟลวง) (2023)
Wongsakanayat (วงศาคณาญาติ) (2023)
Songkram Ngern (สงครามเงิน) (2023)

Thai Series
Love Stage!! (2022) (เลิฟสเตจ)
What Zabb Man! (2022) (What Zabb Man! รักวุ่นวาย นายรสแซ่บ)
Check Out (2022) (Check Out คืนนั้นกับนายดาวเหนือ)
Remember Me (2022) (Remember Me ความรักเขียนด้วยความรัก)
Hit Bite Love (2023) (Hit Bite Love รักชอบเจ็บ) 
The Yearbook (2021) (หนังสือรุ่น)
Love Syndrome III (2023) (รักโคตร ๆ โหดอย่างมึง 3)
Manner of Death (2020) (พฤติการณ์ที่ตาย)

Notable sports
 Muay Thai Kiatphet Or Tor Kor 3 On Or Tor Kor 3 Nonthaburi (past), Rajadamnern Stadium (past), World Siam Stadium (present) (“อมรินทร์ซูเปอร์ไฟต์ ศึกช้างมวยไทยเกียรติเพชร”) Every Saturday from 4:00 PM to 8:00 PM, starting on Saturday, January 7, 2023-present (Sunday from 5:00 PM to 7:00 PM, starting on Sunday, January 20, 2018-January 1, 2023) (Originally broadcast on the channel T-Sports Channel (2 February - 28 September 2014), Channel Bright TV 20 (2 January - 8 October 2016), Channel NOW26 (1 November 2015 - 24 June 2018), Nation TV 22 (1 July 2018 - 13 January 2019))
 The Champion Muay Thai ตัดเชือก Every Saturday from 6:00 PM to 8:00 PM (2019-2020)
 Muay Thai Rajadamnern (“ศึกมวยไทยมรดกคนไทย : ราชดำเนินซุปเปอร์ไฟต์”) On Rajadamnern Stadium Every Friday from 5:00 PM to 7:00 PM Parallel to Online Facebook:GSV ศึกมวยไทยมรดกคนไทย, starting on Friday, November 26, 2021 – present (Originally broadcast on the channel PPVHD36 every sunday from 6:00 PM to 8:00 PM (November 9, 2014 - January 29, 2017), 3SD28 every thursday from 8:30 PM to 10:30 PM (June 7, 2018 - June 13, 2019))

See also 
 Announcements and broadcasters on Amarin TV channel
 List of TV dramas on Amarin TV channel

References

External links

Television stations in Thailand
Television channels and stations established in 2012